The  Baltimore Colts season was the eighth for the team in the National Football League. The season started well for the Colts going 6 to 2. The team looked like they would win their third straight championship. Then in a game on Dec. 4th against the Detroit Lions, star running back Alan Ameche tore his Achilles tendon and missed the final two games. The injury ended his career. With Ameche out, the Colts ended the season losing their last three games, for a total of four consecutive losses. Their record was 6 wins and 6 losses. The team went from first to fourth place in the Western Conference. As a result, their two-year reign as NFL champions came to an end.

Regular season

Schedule

Game summaries

Week 1 
Johnny Unitas extends his record TD-a-game string to 38 with a scoring pass to Raymond Berry. Lenny Moore rammed 4 yards for a touchdown, and Steve Myhra kicked 28 and 18-yard field goals as the Colts began their challenge (unsuccessfully at the end) for a 3rd straight World Championship.

Standings

See also 
 History of the Indianapolis Colts
 Indianapolis Colts seasons
 Colts–Patriots rivalry

References 

Baltimore Colts
Baltimore Colts seasons
Baltimore Colts